Kenneth Kay Kidd is an American human geneticist and emeritus professor of genetics at Yale University School of Medicine. He is known for his work on the role of genetics in disorders such as manic depression and schizophrenia, on human genetic variation and its relationship to geography, and the Out of Africa theory of human evolution. He also helped discover the DRD4-7R gene that has been linked to exploratory behaviour.

Kidd also did work on the forensic identification of individuals by single nucleotide polymorphisms and was a key figure in the 1990s Human Genome Diversity Project (HGDP), which indigenous populations rejected due to fear of exploitation of their genetic material, including for purposes other than medical research ("In the long history of destruction which has accompanied western colonization we have come to realize that the agenda of the non-indigenous forces has been to appropriate and manipulate the natural order for the purposes of profit, power and control.").

Uyghur genetic material controversy 
In 2019, The New York Times alleged that Kidd's collected genetic material from Uyghurs was being used by "scientist's affiliated with China's police" in order to create a genetic database of Uyghurs in China. The piece alleged that Kidd had visited China regularly since 1981, and met with at least one figure within the Ministry of Public Security (China). When contacted by The New York Times, Kidd said to have no knowledge of any potential uses of genetic material for these purposes. He has since asked the Chinese to remove genetic material provided from his work but received no response.

References

External links
Faculty page

American geneticists
Living people
Yale School of Medicine faculty
Population geneticists
University of Wisconsin–Madison alumni
Fellows of the American Association for the Advancement of Science
Year of birth missing (living people)